Stanislav Kűzma (born 16 September 1976) is a retired Slovenian footballer who played as a goalkeeper. He played for clubs in Cyprus, in the Faroe Islands, in Austria and in his homeland Slovenia.

Controversies
Kuzma was allegedly involved in the betting scandal that was being investigated by the authorities in Slovenia and Germany. The Slovenian media were speculating that the main reason why Kuzma played in the Faroe Islands between 2010 and 2012 was the fact that the islands are not part of the European Union.

References

External links
 
 Stanislav Kuzma at NZS 

1976 births
Living people
Prekmurje Slovenes
Slovenian footballers
Association football goalkeepers
NK Beltinci players
NK Korotan Prevalje players
NK Maribor players
NK Nafta Lendava players
Olympiakos Nicosia players
FC Suðuroy players
Slovenian PrvaLiga players
Cypriot Second Division players
Slovenian expatriate footballers
Slovenian expatriate sportspeople in Cyprus
Expatriate footballers in Cyprus
Expatriate footballers in the Faroe Islands
Slovenian expatriate sportspeople in Austria
Expatriate footballers in Austria